Acer taurocursum is an extinct maple species in the family Sapindaceae described from a single fossil samara found in Late Eocene 
lakebed sediments exposed in the state of Nevada, US.  It is one of several extinct species placed in the living section Rubra.

History and classification
Acer taurocursum is represented by a solitary fossil specimen from the northeasternmost part of Nevada. The Bull Run flora, Copper Basin flora, and Elko flora were formed in the same time frame as a result of the activity. These three floras were possibly tied to the Salmon and Cow Creek floras of Central Idaho, and possibly with the John Day Formations Sheep rock flora in Oregon.

Acer taurocursum is one of six Acer species to be described by Wolfe and Tanai in 1987 from the "Bull Run" flora, with the others being A. elkoanum, A. eonegundo, A. cadaver, A. eomediunum, and A. axelrodi.  Like A. taurocursum, A. cadaver is described from fruits.  Acer axelrodi, A. elkoanum, and Acer eomediunum are known from both leaves and fruits, while A. eonegundo is only described form foliage.  Wolfe and Tanai noted that A. taurocursum is the oldest record of the Acer section Eriocarpa.  That section is now considered part of Acer section Rubra.

The holotype for Acer taurocursum is a part specimen numbered UCMP 9089, which at the time of description was preserved in the University of California Museum of Paleontology in Berkeley, California.  The specimen was studied by paleobotanists Jack A. Wolfe of the United States Geological Survey, Denver office and Toshimasa Tanai of Hokkaido University.  Wolfe and Tanai published their 1987 type description for A. taurocursum in the Journal of the Faculty of Science, Hokkaido University.  The etymology of the chosen specific name taurocursum is in recognition of the type location for the species in the Bull Run flora of Nevada.

Description
The general shape of the A. taurocursum nutlet is narrow and elliptic, moderately inflated, and it has a rounded tip end. The paired samaras of the species have a 20° attachment angle. The wing venation is formed by approximately twenty veins that merge along the upper margin of the wing before acutely dichotomizing and anastomosing in the wing membrane. The shape of the nutlet suggested to Wolfe and Tanai placement into Acer section Eriocarpa.

References

taurocursum
Prehistoric angiosperms
Plants described in 1987
Fossil taxa described in 1987
Eocene plants
Flora of Nevada
Extinct flora of North America